Iván Fernando Ochoa Chávez (born 13 August 1996) is a Mexican professional footballer who plays as a midfielder.

Honours
Pachuca
Liga MX: Clausura 2016
CONCACAF Champions League: 2016–17

León
Liga MX: Guardianes 2020

Mexico U17
CONCACAF U-17 Championship: 2013
FIFA U-17 World Cup runner-up: 2013

Individual
FIFA U-17 World Cup Bronze Ball: 2013

External links
 

1996 births
Living people
Mexican expatriate footballers
Mexican footballers
C.F. Pachuca players
Everton de Viña del Mar footballers
Club León footballers
Chilean Primera División players
Expatriate footballers in Chile
Mexican expatriate sportspeople in Chile
Sportspeople from Tampico, Tamaulipas
Footballers from Tamaulipas
Liga MX players
Association football midfielders